Sitalcina is a genus of armoured harvestmen in the family Phalangodidae. There are about 10 described species in Sitalcina.

Species
 Sitalcina borregoensis Briggs, 1968
 Sitalcina californica (Banks, 1893)
 Sitalcina catalina Ubick and Briggs, 2008
 Sitalcina chalona Briggs, 1968
 Sitalcina flava Briggs, 1968
 Sitalcina lobata C.J. Goodnight & M.L. Goodnight, 1942
 Sitalcina peacheyi Ubick & Briggs, 2008
 Sitalcina rothi Ubick & Briggs, 2008
 Sitalcina seca Ubick & Briggs, 2008
 Sitalcina sura Briggs, 1968

References

 Ubick, Darrell, and Thomas S. Briggs (1989). "The harvestman family Phalangodidae. 1. The new genus Calicina, with notes on Sitalcina (Opiliones: Laniatores)". Proceedings of the California Academy of Sciences, vol. 46, no. 4, 95-136.

Harvestmen